Hilmer Ekdahl (1889–1967) was a Swedish cinematographer.

Selected filmography
 A Night of Love by the Öresund (1931)
 House Slaves (1933)
 Eva Goes Aboard (1934)
 Raggen (1936)
 The People of Bergslagen (1937)
 Sun Over Sweden (1938)
 Career (1938)
 Wanted (1939)
 Life Begins Today (1939)
 Her Little Majesty (1939)
 Mot nya tider (1939)
 The Two of Us (1939)
 Heroes in Yellow and Blue (1940)
 The Three of Us (1940)
 A Real Man (1940)
 Magistrarna på sommarlov (1941)
 The Ghost Reporter (1941)
 We House Slaves (1942)
 The Girls in Smaland (1945)
Sin (1948)
 My Sister and I (1950)
 The Girl from Backafall (1953)

References

Bibliography 
 Rasmussen, Bjørn. Filmens hvem-vad-hvor: Udenlanske film 1950-1967. Politiken, 1968.

External links 
 

1889 births
1967 deaths
Artists from Stockholm
Swedish cinematographers